Sillok can refer to:

the Sillok people of Sudan
Sillok is Korean for annual record. See Annals of the Joseon Dynasty